The Caesar & Imperial Cup was a tournament for professional female tennis players played on outdoor hardcourts. The event was classified as a $50,000 ITF Women's Circuit tournament and was held in Taipei, Taiwan, 2012 and 2013.

Finals

Singles

Doubles

External links
 ITF search

ITF Women's World Tennis Tour
Hard court tennis tournaments
Tennis tournaments in Taiwan
Recurring sporting events established in 2012
Recurring sporting events disestablished in 2013
2012 establishments in Taiwan
2013 disestablishments in Taiwan